İffet is a Turkish TV series which aired from September 17, 2011 to September 24, 2012 on Star TV. It is remake of 1982 film same name which Müjde Ar played.

Plot
The story revolves around the character of İffet (Deniz Çakır). She is a young and beautiful daughter of Ahmet Kılıç. She also has a sister named Nimet. They are living in a small house and are very poor. İffet is in love with a taxi driver named Cemil (İbrahim Çelikkol), but they break up  after Cemil raped her during her best friend's wedding. İffet then knows that she is pregnant, but when she tells Cemil, Cemil is unhappy and leaves her. İffet is heartbroken and later her father knows about her pregnancy where he hits her. Cemil proposes to Betül, İffet's friend, who she too is in love with Cemil because he doesn't have money to live where Betül's family has money. They get engaged and later married.

Meanwhile, her boss, Ali İhsan, proposes to her to get married, which she brokenheartedly accepts. After the wedding Ali İhsan notices that Cemil and İffet still love each other. He shoots Cemil with his gun, but his daughter, who is in love with Cemil, jumps in front of him and got a shoot.  Ali Ihsan commits suicide because he thinks that he killed his daughter. After Nil’s father death she decided to back to England where her mother lives.

Cemil and İffet get married and have a daughter, but she goes missing after a car accident.

A man named Halil finds their daughter and raises her. Six years later, he  meets Iffet and became her friend. After he found out that he raised her daughter, he told Iffet that his daughter is actually hers. He didn't want to give away his daughter, and he tried to shoot Iffet, but Cemil arrived and the gun falls. Iffet took the gun and shoots, but instead of Halil, Cemil dies.

Cast
 Deniz Çakır - İffet
 İbrahim Çelikkol - Cemil
 Zuhal Olcay - Dilek
 Melike Güner - Betül
 Mahir Günşiray - Ali İhsan

International broadcasters

  on Tolo TV from March 26, 2013
  on Telefe from May 21, 2018
  on Televizija OBN from January 23, 2014
  on Diema Family from July 1, 2014
  on Mega from July 7, 2017
  on RTL Passion from January 18, 2016
  on Rustavi 2 from October 22, 2013
  on ANT1 from February 22, 2014
  on NEX1TV from October 19, 2013
  on Astana TV from	February, 2014
  on Kohavision TV from October 30, 2013
  on Nova M from May 30, 2019
  on 2M TV from July 5, 2017
  on Kanal 5 from April 10, 2012
  on Imagen from November 27, 2018
  on Geo Kahani from February 24, 2014
  on Kanal D Romania from May 7, 2013
  on Happy from October 10, 2016
  on Star TV from September 17, 2011
  on Viva
  on Canal 10 (Nicaragua)
  on Latina Televisión from September 28, 2020

References

External links 
 
 

Turkish drama television series
2011 Turkish television series debuts
2012 Turkish television series endings
Star TV (Turkey) original programming
Television shows set in Istanbul
Television series produced in Istanbul
Television series set in the 2010s